List of esports events in 2019 (also known as professional gaming).

Calendar of events

Tournaments

References

 
Esports by year